Ireland participated in the Eurovision Song Contest 2019 with the song "22", performed by Sarah McTernan and written by Janieck Devy, Marcia "Misha" Sondeijker and Roel Rats. The song and the singer were internally selected in March 2019 by the Irish broadcaster  (RTÉ) to represent the nation at the contest in Tel Aviv, Israel.

The country's participation attracted some calls for a boycott due to Israel's policies towards Palestine. Prior to the contest, the entry was promoted by a music video and live performances in Spain and the United Kingdom. Ireland competed in the second semi-final of the Eurovision Song Contest, which took place on 16 May 2019. The song placed last at the end of voting, receiving 16 points and subsequently failing to qualify for the grand final.

Background

Ireland has won the contest a record seven times in total, the most out of any nation. The country's first win came in 1970, with then-18-year-old Dana winning with "All Kinds of Everything". Ireland holds the record for being the only country to win the Eurovision Song contest three times in a row (in 1992, 1993 and 1994), as well as having the only three-time winner (Johnny Logan, who won in 1980 as a singer, 1987 as a singer-songwriter, and again in 1992 as a songwriter). At the 2018 contest, Ireland qualified for grand final for the first time in five years, placing 16th with the song "Together" by Ryan O'Shaughnessy.

In October 2018, it was revealed that Ireland had confirmed their participation for Eurovision 2019. The confirmation came as some voices in the country began to call for a boycott of the Israeli contest due to their policies towards Palestinians. This included a campaign from Ireland's third largest political party, . Additionally, a petition was created that amassed close to 3500 signatures. However, Irish deputy Prime Minister  Simon Coveney reaffirmed the Irish commitment to Eurovision, arguing that a boycott would not help the Palestinian cause.

Before Eurovision

Internal selection

 (RTÉ) confirmed their intentions to participate at the 2019 Eurovision Song Contest on 14 September 2018. On 4 October 2018, the broadcaster opened a submission period where artists and composers "with a proven track record of success in the music industry" were able to submit their entries until 23 November 2018. In addition to the public submissions, RTÉ reserved the right to approach established artists and composers to submit entries and to match songs with different artists to the ones who submitted an entry. At the closing of the deadline, 440 entries were received and 70 entries were shortlisted in January 2019. Rumours of the Irish contestant included former One Direction member Niall Horan, Una Healy from the Saturdays and former X Factor contestant Janet Devlin; however both Horan and Delvin denied the rumours.

On 8 March 2019, RTÉ announced that they had internally selected Sarah McTernan to represent Ireland at the Eurovision Song Contest 2019 in Tel Aviv. McTernan had previously attempted to represent San Marino in the Eurovision Song Contest 2018. Along with the announcement that McTernan would represent Ireland on 8 March, name of the song to be performed by McTernan, "22", which was selected by various focus groups that featured music experts, journalists, Eurovision fans and BIMM students, was announced. The song was written by Janieck Devy, Marcia "Misha" Sondeijker and Roel Rats, and was released to Spotify and iTunes on 29 March.

Promotion 
For promotion of the entry, a music video was filmed at the Dollymount Strand in Dublin that features McTernan in a large pink coat by the sea. McTernan's first live performance of the song took place on 10 March, during the Irish version of Dancing with the Stars. She also performed at Eurovision fan events in London and Madrid. Additionally, McTernan travelled to Israel to film her introductory postcard, used in the show to introduce her entry. The postcard depicts McTernan at Eilot date orchard, riding a horse and dancing among the date trees.

At Eurovision

The Eurovision Song Contest 2019 consisted of two semi-finals held on the respective dates of 14 and 16 May and the grand final on 18 May 2019. It was held at Expo Tel Aviv in Tel Aviv, Israel. According to Eurovision rules, all participating nations with the exceptions of the host country and the "Big Five" (France, Germany, Italy, Spain and the United Kingdom) were required to qualify from one of two semi-finals in order to compete for the final, however, the top ten countries from each semi-final progress to the final. On 28 January 2019, a special allocation draw was held which placed each country into one of the two semi-finals, as well as which half of the show they would perform in. Ireland was placed into the second semi-final, to be held on 16 May 2019, and was scheduled to perform in the first half of the show.

The running order for the semi finals was decided by the producers of the Eurovision Song Contest 2019 rather than through another draw; this was done to ensure a cohesive show and mitigate the possibility of similar songs being performed consecutively. Both of the semi finals were broadcast on RTÉ2 while the final was broadcast on RTÉ One. The television broadcasts featured commentary by Irish television personality Marty Whelan.

Semi-final
On 16 May 2019, Ireland performed 2nd in the second semi final, following the entry from Armenia and preceding the entry from Moldova. The performance was themed to fit a 1950s diner and featured McTernan spinning on a bar table and drinking milkshakes. She was praised for her vocal performance.

At the end of the show, Ireland was not announced among the top 10 entries in the second semi-final and therefore failed to qualify to compete in the grand final. It was later revealed that country placed last at number 18 in the semi-final, receiving a total of 16 points: 3 points from the televoting and 13 from the juries.

Voting
Voting during the three shows involved each country awarding two sets of points from 1-8, 10 and 12: one from their professional jury and the other from televoting. Each nation's jury consisted of five music industry professionals who are citizens of the country they represent, with their names published before the contest to ensure transparency. The jury judged each entry based on: vocal capacity, the stage performance, the song's composition and originality, and the overall impression by the act. In addition, no member of a national jury was permitted to be related in any way to any of the competing acts in such a way that they cannot vote impartially and independently. The individual rankings of each jury member as well as the nation's televoting results were released shortly after the grand final.

Points awarded to Ireland

Points awarded by Ireland

Detailed voting results
The following members comprised the Irish jury:
 Paddy McKenna (jury chairperson)singer, songwriter, band lead singer, broadcaster
 Emma Reynoldssinger
 Jennifer O'Brienmusic and entertainment journalist
 Aidan O'Connorsongwriter
 Ronan Hardimancomposer, songwriter

References 

2019
Countries in the Eurovision Song Contest 2019
Eurovision
Eurovision